A flatbed trolley a common form of freight transport in distribution environments, for moving bulk loads. Trolleys can aid in reducing effort required to move a load by allowing the user to pull or push instead of lift and carry. A very simple design offers a basic flat platform with four casters and a fixed handle which is used to either push or pull the platform with the load on the platform. Without a flat surface it becomes an open frame trolley and without a handle it is a bogie or dolly.

A flatbed trolley is also sometimes called a dray, but the term dray is also used to refer to a truck with no sides.

Materials 
The frame is usually fabricated steel. The primary flatbed surface can be constructed from wooden boards, plastic, steel or mesh. Flatbed casters can vary dramatically, made of solid rubber, air filled pneumatic or cast iron. The caster is generally the component on the flatbed trolley that limits the safe working capacity.

Types 
There are many types of specialised trolleys, including:

Baggage trolley 

A baggage trolley is used to move baggage at an airport, railway station and a bus station.

Piano trolley  
A piano trolley or piano dolly is a two- or four-wheeled trolley featuring a stronger-than-usual frame. The piano trolley is placed under the centre of mass of the piano and allows it to be turned on its axis to manoeuvre round a building. By placing the trolley at one end of the instrument, stairs may be negotiated. In tight spaces the piano may be turned on end and rested on the trolley. Typical features include solid rubber tyres, very strong construction, and thick rubber bumpers along the top and on the ends. Before a piano trolley can be used to move a grand piano, the piano must be protected by a piano shoe, a wooden frame which protects the polished surface and provides additional strength for the sides.

U-boat trolley  
A U-boat trolley is used to move and stock goods by retailers such as grocery stores, and has two high handles on opposite ends of a thin flatbed.

Balance trolley 
Balance trolleys often have wheels mounted on a central axle to create a pivot point, operating in a similar fashion to a seesaw. These centrally mounted wheels allow the operator to rotate the trolley on a central axis, providing a turning circle no longer than the length of the trolley.

Turntable trolley 
The trolley shown below is termed a turntable trolley due to its steering mechanism. Unlike a flatbed trolley that is mounted on castors, turntable trolleys are mounted on solid axles which allows a much higher load capacity. The rear axles are fixed to the chassis, and the front wheels are attached to a steering mechanism that allows the trolley to be turned when moved.

Remote controlled or autonomous trolley 
Modern factory systems commonly track individual trolleys digitally to facilitate automated bills of lading; automated systems may have remotely operated or autonomous trolleys for transport during storage and access.

See also

 Baggage trailer
 Boat dolly
 Conflat
Creeper (tool)
Dolly (trailer)
Electrocar
Electric platform truck
Flatbed truck
Flatcar
 Flat wagon
Hand truck
Toy wagon
 Trolley (disambiguation)
Wheelbarrow

References

Tools
Moving and relocation
Human-powered vehicles